Munja may refer to:

 Munja Aboriginal Cattle Station or Munja Aboriginal reserve, historic property within the Charnley River–Artesian Range Wildlife Sanctuary, Western Australia
 Munja i grom, a song by Vukašin Brajić
 Munjamyeong of Goguryeo, a 5th-century monarch of Goguryeo in present-day Korea
 Tripidium bengalense, synonym Saccharum munja, a grass
 Upanayana ceremony
 Vakpati Munja, 10th century Paramara king from Malwa region of central India